Orkhan Sadigli (born on 19 March 1993) is an Azerbaijani professional footballer who last played as a goalkeeper for Zira in the Azerbaijan Premier League.

Club career
On 5 August 2012, Sadigli made his debut in the Azerbaijan Premier League for Khazar Lankaran match against Ravan Baku.<ref></ref. 2022/2023 Kapaz Pfc

References

External links
 

1993 births
Living people
Association football goalkeepers
Azerbaijani footballers
Azerbaijan youth international footballers
Azerbaijan under-21 international footballers
Azerbaijan Premier League players
Khazar Lankaran FK players
Shamakhi FK players
Sumgayit FK players
Zira FK players